Sirsa district is the largest district of Haryana state. Sirsa is the district headquarters. Sirsa district and fatehabad district are parts of Rathi region of Punjab,Haryana,Rajasthan.
Ganga and Choutala are the largest Villages of Sirsa district

Etymology
The district is named after its headquarters, Sirsa. The name, Sirsa is derived from its ancient Sanskrit name Sairishaka, which is mentioned in the Mahabharata, the Ashtadhyayi and the Divyavadana. In Mahabharata, Sairishaka is described as being taken by Nakula in his conquest of the western quarter. It must have been a flourishing city in the 5th century B.C. as it has been mentioned by Panini.

There are a number of legends about the origin of the name of the town. Its ancient name was Sairishaka and from that it seems to have been corrupted to Sirsa. According to local tradition, an unknown king named Saras founded the town in the 7th century A.D. and built a fort. The material remains of an ancient fort can still be seen in the south-east of the present town. It is about 5 km in circumference. According to another tradition, the name has its origin from the sacred river Sarasvati which one flowed near it. During the medieval period, the town was known as Sarsuti. It has been mentioned as Sarsuti by a number of medieval historians. The derivation of name Sirsa, is also attributed to the abundance of siris trees (Albizia lebbeck (Benth)) in the neighborhood of Sirsa which seems quite plausible for it finds some corroboration also in Panini and his commentator. In the ancient period, Sirsa was also known as Sirsapattan.However some local still believes that name may be derived from famous Sarsai Nath whose temple is there in the city.

History
In 1819, the territory occupied by the present district was taken over by the British and it became part of the North Western district of the Delhi territory. In 1820, the North Western district was bifurcated into Northern and Western districts and this territory became part of Western district, which was later renamed Haryana district. In 1837, it was separated from Haryana district and merged with newly formed Bhattiana district. In 1858, Bhattiana district was transferred to Punjab Province along with the rest of Haryana region and renamed Sirsa district. In 1884, Sirsa district was abolished, its two tehsils, Sirsa and Dabwali were merged to form Sirsa tehsil, which became part of Hissar district of Punjab Province. On 1 November 1966, it became part of newly formed state of Haryana. In 1968, Sirsa tehsil was again bifurcated to Sirsa and Dabwali tehsils. The present district was carved out on 1 September 1975 by amalgamating Sirsa and Dabwali tehsils of erstwhile Hissar district.

Economy
In 2006 the Ministry of Panchayati Raj named Sirsa one of the country's 250 most backward districts (out of a total of 640). It is one of the two districts in Haryana that used to receive funds from the Backward Regions Grant Fund Programme (BRGF).

Divisions
The district comprises five tehsils: Sirsa, 
Dabwali, Rania, Kalanwali and Ellenabad. These tehsils are further sub-divided into 7 blocks: Baragudha, Dabwali, Ellenabad, Nathusary Chopta, Odhan, Rania and Sirsa.

There are 5 Vidhan Sabha constituencies in this district: Kalanwali, Dabwali, Rania, Sirsa and Ellenabad. All of these are part of Sirsa Lok Sabha constituency.

Demographics

According to the 2011 census Sirsa district has a population of 1,295,189, roughly equal to the nation of Mauritius or the US state of New Hampshire. This gives it a ranking of 378th in India (out of a total of 640). As of the 2011 census, its population growth rate over the decade 2001-2011 was 15.99%, with a sex ratio of 897 females for every 1000 males and a literacy rate of 68.82%. Scheduled Castes make up 29.91% of the population.

Religion

Languages 

Hindi is the official language of the district with Bagri and Haryanvi as its major dialects. Punjabi is the additional official language.

Notable people from Sirsa district 

 Barinder Sran - Indian cricketer
 Devi Lal - former Deputy Prime Minister of India, Former Chief Minister of Haryana
 Harpal Singh - Indian  Hockey player 
 Ganeshi Lal - Governor of Odisha
 Gajendra Verma - singer, composer, lyricist 
  Gopal Kanda - businessman and politician, member of the Haryana Legislative Assembly
 Gurmeet Ram Rahim Singh - third master of Dera Sacha Sauda, convicted rapist
 Hari Singh Dilbar - Punjabi language poet
 Jagdish Nehra - former Education and Irrigation Minister
 Jaswinder Brar - Punjabi folk singer
 Maninder Buttar - Punjabi Singer
 Manmohan Singh  - Famous Director, cinematographer, singer in Hindi & Punjabi Movies.
 Om Prakash Chautala - former Chief Minister of Haryana
 Rupinder Handa - Punjabi Singer 
 Sardara Singh - Former Indian  Hockey team Captain
 Satwant Kaur - Bollywood and Punjabi actress
Savita Punia - National  Hockey player 
 Sunil Grover - comedian and actor
  Vikram Singh - music producer - composer

References

External links
Sirsa District- Sirsa district official Government website

 
Districts of Haryana
Minority Concentrated Districts in India
1975 establishments in Haryana